Sir Robert Adrian Hicks (born 18 January 1938) is a former Conservative Party politician in the United Kingdom.

Hicks unsuccessfully contested Aberavon in 1966. He was Member of Parliament for Bodmin from 1970 to February 1974 (when the seat was temporarily gained by the Liberals) and from October 1974 to 1983.  After boundary changes, he was MP for South East Cornwall from 1983 until he stood down in 1997.

In 1999, he came out in support of the Pro Euro Conservative Party.

References

Times Guide to the House of Commons, Times Newspapers Limited, October 1974 and 1992 editions.

External links 

 

1938 births
Living people
Conservative Party (UK) MPs for English constituencies
Members of the Parliament of the United Kingdom for constituencies in Cornwall
UK MPs 1970–1974
UK MPs 1974–1979
UK MPs 1979–1983
UK MPs 1983–1987
UK MPs 1987–1992
UK MPs 1992–1997
Politicians from Cornwall
Politicians of the Pro-Euro Conservative Party
Politicians awarded knighthoods
Members of the Parliament of the United Kingdom for Bodmin